"Wafai" or "Wafa'i" may refer to:
a Sufi order, offshoot of the Suhrawardiyya order
a Muslim name
'Abd al-'Aziz al-Wafa'i
Muhammad Wafai
a place in Iran, Abu ol Vafai